House of Zwide is a South African television drama series. It is an e.tv original production, co-produced by The Bomb Shelter and Videovision Entertainment for e.tv. The series stars Vusi Kunene, Khaya Dladla, Nefisa Mkhabela, and Winnie Ntshaba, among others.

Premise

Season 1
Funani and Faith Zwide are the pioneers behind the fast-growing fashion and textile empire in the country, House  of 
Zwide.

In the early stages of the company, Faith who was Funani's secretary had an affair with Funani. His wife found out about it and Faith went to her, trying to explain and apologise but instead ; she and Funani's wife (Busi) fought.

In the fight, Faith stabbed Busi (Funani's wife) with a scissors in the neck and unfortunately, she died. Panicking, Faith called Isaac, a hitman whom is her ex-boyfriend to come and help her. Since Isaac would do anything for Faith because he still loved her, he helped her.

Isaac and Faith plotted on burning down the house with Busi inside so it could look like her death was a result of the fire. Faith leaves and Isaac starts on the job.
 
Isaac succeeds in burning down the house, not knowing that Nkosi and Zobuhle, Busi and Funani's kids were there. Getting out, Isaac hears a newborn baby ; Zobuhle's cry and he fails to leave it to die but instead decides to raise it as his own. He names the baby Onalerona.

In her twenties, she aspires to be the best designer in the industry but doesn't know the past is yet to haunt her.

Staring: Vusi Kunene, Nefisa Mkhabela & Bawinile Ntshaba

Season 2
Picking up from the previous season's events, the truth details the normal everyday lives of both the Zwide and Molapo families. Funani unleashes her wrath on Faith and Isaac, and Ona struggles with her newfound identity and is not ready to accept it. This season introduces a new villain to Funani. Alex Khodzi (Warren Masemola), a villain who is in a fashion war with Funani and will do anything to take Funani down. Fait gets divorced by Funani and sentences her to the life of poverty but Faith moves in with Shoki and Soka trying to regain her lavish lifestyle.

Starring: Warren Masemola, Vusi Kunene

Characters
List of cast members

 Vusi Kunene as Funani Zwide: South Africa's biggest and most influential fashionista. The owner, founder and CEO of House of Zwide. He has a huge crush on Reabetswe Molapo.
 Winnie Ntshaba as Faith Zwide: Funani's supportive wife and co-founder of the House of Zwide. She and Isaac know the truth about Ona but they are trying to hide it. She is the one who left Funani's mother to die.
 Jeffery Sekele as Isaac Molapo: An Umkhonto we Sizwe veteran and gangster. He is Faith Zwide's ex. He is not Ona's real Father.He actually stole her when burning the house of Funani Zwide helping Faith.He is now married to Rea Molapo, Keletso's mother
 Nefisa Mkhabela as Onalerona "Ona" Molapo: A 20-year-old who aspires to be in fashion industry. She finds herself in the House Of Zwide pursuing her passion. She had brief relationships with Sandile and Soka.The real Zobuhle
 Matshepo Maleme as Rea Molapo: Isaac's wife. She is burdened with the secret that Ona is not her and Isaac's daughter.
 Khaya Dladla as Lazarus: Funani's friend and confidanté. He is responsible for interpreting and creating Funani's designs. Obsessed with neatness and immaculately groomed, he has a no nonsense attitude.
 Noah Cohen as De Villiers: Described as a well-dressed businessman with a villainous side.
 Shalate Sekhabi as Shoki: Ona's best friend who wants to be a model. She is in a relationship with Nkosi Zwide.
 Londeka Mchunu as Zanele Zwide: Funani and Faith's daughter. While adored by her father, she desperately seeks her mother's approval. She proves to be a valuable asset to the business by being a social media influencer.
 Wanda Zuma as Nkosi Zwide: Funani and Faith's son. He is expected to carry on the family's legacy. He is in love with Shoki.
Paballo Mavundla as Sandile:He is an intern at House of Zwide. He was in a brief relationship with Onalerona and was friends with benefits with Zanele Zwide until she was in a relationship with LJ.
Karabo Mapongwa as Keletso: She is Isaac and Rea Molapo's youngest daughter. She is an intelligent grade 7 learner and was recently bullied by her friends for "snitching" but later stood up for herself.
Lwazi Mthembu as Nomsa: She is a fashion designer and she is playing a role of a mother  to her younger sister Shoki since their grandmother's death. She is Molefe's former girlfriend and was also involved in a love triangle with Dorothy and Molefe

Cast Shown on opening scene
Vusi Kunene
Winnie Ntshaba
Jeffrey Sekele
Matshepo Malema
Khaya Dladla
Motlatsi Mafatshe
Shalate Sekhabi
Lwazilubanzi Mthembu
Wanda Blaq Zuma
Londeka Mchunu
Sikelelwa Vuyeleni
Paballo Mavundla
Noah Cohen
Lois Du Plesis
Linda Nxumalo
Nefisa Mkhabela

Cast

Production
On 24 November 2020 it was announced that long-running e.tv soapie Rhythm City is being canceled. The channel said that the decision to end the series was part of a business strategy.

In February 2021, The Bomb Shelter sent out a casting call for the female lead role of the series, which at the time had been unspecified. The lead character is described as ambitious and independent woman who loves fashion. Entrants had to send a one-minute monologue to The Bomb Shelter via email before 28 February.

On 9 June, the channel had a press release, announcing that House of Zwide would be the replacement for Rhythm City.

On 24 June, the channel released the official trailer for House of Zwide.

House of zwide 
The series that is mostlybased on a girl that was lost from her father for 20 years and now that they have found each other they are trying to get to know each other better

Reception 
The series, throughout its run, has retained its predecessor's position as the channel's second most-watched series, peaking at 4.58 million viewers.

References

External links
House of Zwide as TVSA

South African television soap operas
2021 South African television series debuts
E.tv original programming